Esenli is a village in the Kızıltepe District of Mardin Province in Turkey. The village had a population of 306 in 2021.

References 

Villages in Kızıltepe District
Kurdish settlements in Mardin Province